MC Pitman is a rapper and hip-hop producer from Coalville, Leicestershire, UK.

MC Pitman is the alter-ego of Styly Cee, a former Pirate Radio DJ based in Nottingham. Prior to creating Pitman, he was member of Lost Island, with another rapper called Frisco.

Pitman's music is a combination of American-style hip hop production, combined with humorous and satirical lyrics.  He speaks with a prominent East Midlands English accent.  Amongst his targets are UK group The Streets, pop rap and Tony Blair.  He styles himself as a coal miner, and appears on stage and in videos dressed in a British Coal NCB Donkey Jacket, a hard hat with a lamp and a flask of tea.  His face is often covered in coal dust.

Discography

Albums
It Takes a Nation of Tossers, Son Records, 2003
Pit Closure, Son Records, 2004
The Dirty Helmet Sessions, Son Records, 2008

Singles
"Phone Pitman 2" (7-inch), Son Records, 2002
"Witness the Pitness" (7-inch), Son Records, 2002
"It Takes Tea" (7-inch), Son Records, 2003
"Music Maker" (7-inch), Son Records, 2007

References

External links
Son Records
BBC article

Living people
English male rappers
Year of birth missing (living people)